Deccanodon is an extinct genus of dromatheriid cynodonts which existed in India during the Late Triassic. The type species is D. maleriensis, named in 2007. Deccanodon was one of the first Triassic cynodonts named from India and was found in the Maleri Formation in Adilabad district.

References

Prehistoric prozostrodonts
Prehistoric cynodont genera
Triassic synapsids of Asia
Fossil taxa described in 2007
Extinct animals of India
Late Triassic synapsids